Becharof Wilderness is a wilderness area in the U.S. state of Alaska.  Located within the Becharof National Wildlife Refuge, it comprises approximately 500,000 acres (2,000 km2) and is bordered by the Katmai Wilderness on the north.  It was designated Wilderness in 1980 by the Alaska National Interest Lands Conservation Act. The region is home to a wide array of wildlife, including brown bears, salmon, caribou, and migratory birds.

See also
List of U.S. Wilderness Areas
Wilderness Act

References

External links
 Becharof National Wildlife Refuge
 Becharof Wilderness - Wilderness.net

Wilderness areas of Alaska
Protected areas of Kodiak Island Borough, Alaska
Protected areas of Lake and Peninsula Borough, Alaska